Utah was admitted to the Union on January 4, 1896, and it popularly elects U.S. senators to Class 1 and Class 3, despite the Utah State Legislature's rejection of the Seventeenth Amendment to the United States Constitution when it was passed in 1913. Its current senators are Republicans Mike Lee and Mitt Romney. Orrin Hatch was Utah's longest-serving senator (1977–2019).

List of senators

|- style="height:2em"
| colspan=3 | Vacant
| Jan 4, 1896 –Jan 22, 1896
| Utah elected its senators 18 days after statehood.
| rowspan=3 | 1
| rowspan=2 
| rowspan=2 | 1
| Utah elected its senators 18 days after statehood.
| Jan 4, 1896 –Jan 22, 1896
| colspan=3 | Vacant

|- style="height:2em"
! rowspan=2 | 1
| rowspan=2 align=left | Frank J. Cannon
|  | Republican 
| rowspan=2 nowrap | Jan 22, 1896 –Mar 3, 1899
| rowspan=2 | Elected in 1896.
| Elected in 1896.Retired.
| nowrap | Jan 22, 1896 –Mar 3, 1897
|  | Republican
| align=right | Arthur Brown
! 1

|- style="height:2em"
|  | SilverRepublican
| 
| rowspan=4 | 2
| rowspan=4 | Elected in 1897.Lost re-election.
| rowspan=4 nowrap | Mar 4, 1897 –Mar 3, 1903
| rowspan=4  | Democratic
| rowspan=4 align=right | Joseph Lafayette Rawlins
! rowspan=4 | 2

|- style="height:2em"
| colspan=3 | Vacant
| nowrap | Mar 4, 1899 –Jan 23, 1901
| Legislature failed to elect.
| rowspan=4 | 2
| 

|- style="height:2em"
! rowspan=3 | 2
| rowspan=3 align=left | Thomas Kearns
| rowspan=3  | Republican
| rowspan=3 nowrap | Jan 23, 1901 –Mar 3, 1905
| rowspan=3 | Elected late in 1901.Retired.

|- style="height:2em"
| 

|- style="height:2em"
| 
| rowspan=3 | 3
| rowspan=3 | Elected in 1903.
| rowspan=15 nowrap | Mar 4, 1903 –Mar 3, 1933
| rowspan=15  | Republican
| rowspan=15 align=right | Reed Smoot
! rowspan=15 | 3

|- style="height:2em"
! rowspan=6 | 3
| rowspan=6 align=left | George Sutherland
| rowspan=6  | Republican
| rowspan=6 nowrap | Mar 4, 1905 –Mar 3, 1917
| rowspan=3 | Elected in 1905.
| rowspan=3 | 3
| 

|- style="height:2em"
| 

|- style="height:2em"
| 
| rowspan=3 | 4
| rowspan=3 | Re-elected in 1909.

|- style="height:2em"
| rowspan=3 | Re-elected in 1911.Lost re-election.
| rowspan=3 | 4
| 

|- style="height:2em"
| 

|- style="height:2em"
| 
| rowspan=3 | 5
| rowspan=3 | Re-elected in 1914.

|- style="height:2em"
! rowspan=12 | 4
| rowspan=12 align=left | William H. King
| rowspan=12  | Democratic
| rowspan=12 nowrap | Mar 4, 1917 –Jan 3, 1941
| rowspan=3 | Elected in 1916.
| rowspan=3 | 5
| 

|- style="height:2em"
| 

|- style="height:2em"
| 
| rowspan=3 | 6
| rowspan=3 | Re-elected in 1920.

|- style="height:2em"
| rowspan=3 | Re-elected in 1922.
| rowspan=3 | 6
| 

|- style="height:2em"
| 

|- style="height:2em"
| 
| rowspan=3 | 7
| rowspan=3 | Re-elected in 1926.Lost re-election.

|- style="height:2em"
| rowspan=3 | Re-elected in 1928.
| rowspan=3 | 7
| 

|- style="height:2em"
| 

|- style="height:2em"
| 
| rowspan=3 | 8
| rowspan=3 | Elected in 1932.
| rowspan=9 nowrap | Mar 4, 1933 –Jan 3, 1951
| rowspan=9  | Democratic
| rowspan=9 align=right | Elbert D. Thomas
! rowspan=9 | 4

|- style="height:2em"
| rowspan=3 | Re-elected in 1934.Lost renomination.
| rowspan=3 | 8
| 

|- style="height:2em"
| 

|- style="height:2em"
| 
| rowspan=3 | 9
| rowspan=3 | Re-elected in 1938.

|- style="height:2em"
! rowspan=3 | 5
| rowspan=3 align=left | Abe Murdock
| rowspan=3  | Democratic
| rowspan=3 nowrap | Jan 3, 1941 –Jan 3, 1947
| rowspan=3 | Elected in 1940.Lost re-election.
| rowspan=3 | 9
| 

|- style="height:2em"
| 

|- style="height:2em"
| 
| rowspan=3 | 10
| rowspan=3 | Re-elected in 1944.Lost re-election.

|- style="height:2em"
! rowspan=6 | 6
| rowspan=6 align=left | Arthur Vivian Watkins
| rowspan=6  | Republican
| rowspan=6 nowrap | Jan 3, 1947 –Jan 3, 1959
| rowspan=3 | Elected in 1946.
| rowspan=3 | 10
| 

|- style="height:2em"
| 

|- style="height:2em"
| 
| rowspan=3 | 11
| rowspan=3 | Elected in 1950.
| rowspan=12 nowrap | Jan 3, 1951 –Dec 20, 1974
| rowspan=12  | Republican
| rowspan=12 align=right | Wallace F. Bennett
! rowspan=12 | 5

|- style="height:2em"
| rowspan=3 | Re-elected in 1952.Lost re-election.
| rowspan=3 | 11
| 

|- style="height:2em"
| 

|- style="height:2em"
| 
| rowspan=3 | 12
| rowspan=3 | Re-elected in 1956.

|- style="height:2em"
! rowspan=10 | 7
| rowspan=10 align=left | Frank Moss
| rowspan=10  | Democratic
| rowspan=10 nowrap | Jan 3, 1959 –Jan 3, 1977
| rowspan=3 | Elected in 1958.
| rowspan=3 | 12
| 

|- style="height:2em"
| 

|- style="height:2em"
| 
| rowspan=3 | 13
| rowspan=3 | Re-elected in 1962.

|- style="height:2em"
| rowspan=3 | Re-elected in 1964.
| rowspan=3 | 13
| 

|- style="height:2em"
| 

|- style="height:2em"
| 
| rowspan=4 | 14
| rowspan=3 | Re-elected in 1968.Retired, and resigned early to give successor preferential seniority.

|- style="height:2em"
| rowspan=4 | Re-elected in 1970.Lost re-election.
| rowspan=4 | 14
| 

|- style="height:2em"
| 

|- style="height:2em"
| Appointed to finish Bennett's term, having already been elected to the next term.
| rowspan=10 nowrap | Dec 21, 1974 –Jan 3, 1993
| rowspan=10  | Republican
| rowspan=10 align=right | Jake Garn
! rowspan=10 | 6

|- style="height:2em"
| 
| rowspan=3 | 15
| rowspan=3 | Elected in 1974.

|- style="height:2em"
! rowspan=21 | 8
| rowspan=21 align=left | Orrin Hatch
| rowspan=21  | Republican
| rowspan=21 nowrap | Jan 3, 1977 –Jan 3, 2019
| rowspan=3 | Elected in 1976.
| rowspan=3 | 15
| 

|- style="height:2em"
| 

|- style="height:2em"
| 
| rowspan=3 | 16
| rowspan=3 | Re-elected in 1980.

|- style="height:2em"
| rowspan=3 | Re-elected in 1982.
| rowspan=3 | 16
| 

|- style="height:2em"
| 

|- style="height:2em"
| 
| rowspan=3 | 17
| rowspan=3 | Re-elected in 1986.Retired.

|- style="height:2em"
| rowspan=3 | Re-elected in 1988.
| rowspan=3 | 17
| 

|- style="height:2em"
| 

|- style="height:2em"
| 
| rowspan=3 | 18
| rowspan=3 | Elected in 1992.
| rowspan=9 nowrap | Jan 3, 1993 –Jan 3, 2011
| rowspan=9  | Republican
| rowspan=9 align=right | Bob Bennett
! rowspan=9 | 7

|- style="height:2em"
| rowspan=3 | Re-elected in 1994.
| rowspan=3 | 18
| 

|- style="height:2em"
| 

|- style="height:2em"
| 
| rowspan=3 | 19
| rowspan=3 | Re-elected in 1998.

|- style="height:2em"
| rowspan=3 | Re-elected in 2000.
| rowspan=3 | 19
| 

|- style="height:2em"
| 

|- style="height:2em"
| 
| rowspan=3 | 20
| rowspan=3 | Re-elected in 2004.Lost renomination.

|- style="height:2em"
| rowspan=3 | Re-elected in 2006.
| rowspan=3 | 20
| 

|- style="height:2em"
| 

|- style="height:2em"
| 
| rowspan=3 | 21
| rowspan=3 | Elected in 2010.
| rowspan=9 nowrap | Jan 3, 2011 –Present
| rowspan=9  | Republican
| rowspan=9 align=right | Mike Lee
! rowspan=9 | 8

|- style="height:2em"
| rowspan=3 | Re-elected in 2012.Retired.
| rowspan=3 | 21
| 

|- style="height:2em"
| 

|- style="height:2em"
| 
| rowspan=3 | 22
| rowspan=3 | Re-elected in 2016.

|- style="height:2em"
! rowspan=3 | 9
| rowspan=3 align=left | Mitt Romney
| rowspan=3  | Republican
| rowspan=3 nowrap | Jan 3, 2019 –Present
| rowspan=3 | Elected in 2018.
| rowspan=3 | 22
| 

|- style="height:2em"
| 

|- style="height:2em"
| 
| rowspan=3 | 23
| rowspan=3 | Re-elected in 2022.

|- style="height:2em"
| rowspan=3 colspan=5 | To be determined in the 2024 election.
| rowspan=3 | 23
| 

|- style="height:2em"
| 

|- style="height:2em"
| 
| 24
| colspan=5 | To be determined in the 2028 election.

See also

 United States congressional delegations from Utah
 List of United States representatives from Utah
 Elections in Utah

References

 
United States Senators
Utah